Events from the year 1753 in Canada.

Incumbents
French Monarch: Louis XV
British and Irish Monarch: George II

Governors
Governor General of New France: Michel-Ange Duquesne de Menneville
Colonial Governor of Louisiana: Pierre de Rigaud, Marquis de Vaudreuil-Cavagnial then Louis Billouart
Governor of Nova Scotia: Peregrine Hopson
Commodore-Governor of Newfoundland: Hugh Bonfoy

Events
 The 2nd Fort Paskoya built at a new location which became the Pas.
 A trading post, to be later known as Fort de la Corne was built just below the junction of the two branches of the Saskatchewan.
 Fort Rouge rebuilt by Jacques Legardeur de Saint-Pierre at its original location.

Births

Deaths
 October 17 - François-Josué de la Corne Dubreuil, a soldier and trader. (born 1710)

Historical documents
"It was not for a port or two in Nova Scotia, but for all North America" - British end boundary talks when French claim entire Ohio River

Optimistic letter describes French forces and objectives in New York, Nova Scotia and all British colonies (Note: anti-Protestant comment)

Secretary of State orders governors to "use their best Endeavours to repel Force by Force" if British colonies are encroached on

Board of Trade warns of "fatal consequences" to British security and trade from French control of Saint John River

Gov. Hopson hopes removing French flag from Nova Scotia will reconcile Indigenous people and Acadians to British rule

Nova Scotia Council accedes to petition of Minas Basin Acadians that their priests not be required to take oath of allegiance

Gov. Lawrence notes difficulty resolving litigation (or producing "a spirit of improvement") among Acadians lacking oath of allegiance

Assuming Nova Scotia settlements retarded mostly "by the Indian enemy," judge offers extended description of resistance routes and resources

1753 law allows naturalization of Jews in colonies after 3 years, replacing 1740 law requiring 7 years; but "clamors" soon cause its repeal

New Yorker concerned that "very considerable Trade" with Canada carried only by Kahnawake residents will induce "our Indians to desert"

Susana's prisoner in Kahnawake, given to replace her dead relative, to be redeemed by means of wampum belt (Note: "squaw" used)

Nissendanie from Kahnawake delivers prisoner to Albany for 10 Spanish dollars, strouds, stockings, rum and food for return trip

Kahnewake sachem Sconondo and Avieghta, holder of British prisoner, demand enslaved boy for ransom payment (Note: "savage" used)

Kahnewake sachems Onorogigta and Sanagowana with several warriors bring two prisoners and reconcile with commissioners

Population of Quebec City - "In 1753, the number was computed to be 15,000 inhabitants, and 500 soldiers

Quebec City as well as Halifax, Louisbourg and Lake Superior are mentioned in directions for observing transit of Mercury

References 

 
Canada
53